Wetaskiwin Composite High School (WCHS) is a public senior high school in Wetaskiwin, Alberta and a part of Wetaskiwin Regional Division No. 11.

In addition to Wetaskiwin it serves Millet, sections of the County of Wetaskiwin, and the Four Nations Reserve.

References

External links
 Wetaskiwin Composite High School
High schools in Alberta
Wetaskiwin